"Spirit in the Sky" is a 1969 song by Norman Greenbaum, later covered by other artists.

Spirit in the Sky may also refer to:
"Spirit in the Sky" (Keiino song), Norwegian entry in the Eurovision Song Contest 2019
Spirit in the Sky (album), a 1969 album by Norman Greenbaum
Spirits in the Sky, a band formed in 2009, led by Billy Corgan

See also
Spirit of the sky or sky deity